Uromyces striatus is a plant pathogen causing rust in Medicago. Alfalfa (Medicago sativa) rust caused by Uromyces striatus is an important disease in many areas and is damaging to alfalfa grown for seed.

References

External links 
 Index Fungorum
 USDA ARS Fungal Database

Fungal plant pathogens and diseases
Uromyces
Fungi described in 1870
Taxa named by Joseph Schröter